Pétéga is a village situated in the Nassoumbou Department in the province of Soum.

History
On March 22, 2017, a leader of Ansar ul Islam, Harouna Dicko, was killed in Pétéga by Burkina Fasan security forces.

References 

Populated places in the Sahel Region